Haji Bayram Veli or Wali (1352–1430) was an Ottoman poet, Sufi saint, and the founder of the Bayrami Order. He also composed a number of hymns (ilahi in Turkish).

Biography

Early life 
He lived between 1352 and 1430. His original name was Numan, he changed it to Bayram after he met his spiritual leader Somunju Baba during the festival of Eid ul-Adha (called Kurban Bayramı in Turkish).

Haji Bayram was born in small village in Ankara Province, and became a scholar of Islam. His life changed after he received instruction in Tasawwuf in the city of Kayseri from Shāikh Hāmeed Hāmeed’ūd-Dīn-ee Wālī, who was actually one of the murshids of the Sāfav’īyyah Tariqah Sheikh Khoja Alā ad-Dīn Alī.

Pilgrimage and the foundation of his order 
The two mystics, Shāikh Hāmeed’ūd-Dīn-ee Wālī (Somunju Baba) and Haji Bayram, were living in the city of Bursa when they made the Hajj (pilgrimage to Mecca) together. During this holy journey Hāmeed’ūd-Dīn-ee Wālī continued to teach sufism. Shāikh Hāmeed’ūd-Dīn died in 1412 passing his authority to Haji Bayram Wali, who returned to Ankara as the sheikh (leader) of a tariqa called Bayrami. He built a Dervish lodge on the site in Ankara where his tomb and mosque stand today. People came to stay there and learn about sufism. The order grew popular with Bayram's successful teaching.

Akshemsaddin and Haji Bayram 
The growth of the order perturbed some local authorities; they shared their worries with the Ottoman Sultan Murad II, who called Haji Bayram to Edirne (the capital of the Ottoman Empire at that time). The Sultan wanted to test the opinions, doctrine and the patriotism of the order. At this time in Anatolia there were many independent Turkish clans with little unity among them.

Haji Bayram took another scholar, his murid Akshemsaddin (Aqq-Shams’ūd-Dīn) (“Ak” means “The Pure White” in Turkish), with him to Edirne to meet the Sultan. Murad soon understood that the complaints against Bayram were merely rumours and Haji Bayram and Akshemseddin stayed for a while in Edirne, lecturing and preaching to the court. He had more private consultations with the Sultan in which they discussed matters of the world, life and the future.

In particular the Sultan was concerned with the conquest of Constantinople, the Byzantine capital that the armies of Islam had struggled to conquer without success. The Sultan asked Bayram directly, "Who will conquer the city?" The reply came: "You will not. But this baby shall. You and I will not be alive at the time of that conquest. But my student Akshemseddin will be there." The baby was the Sultan's son, the future Mehmed II, who would conquer the city (which later became known as Istanbul) in 1453 and receive the title Fatih (meaning the conqueror).

Haji Bayram requested that his student Akshemseddin be the teacher of the baby Mehmed, and Sultan Murad agreed. Haji Bayram made a few more trips to Edirne until he died in 1430 in Ankara, passing the leadership of his order to Akshemseddin. His tomb and the mosque dedicated to him are in Ankara.

The evolutionary development of the "Bāyrāmī Order" throughout Anatolia 

{{Tree chart| | | | | | | | | | |:| | | |:| |`|ZHE | |AKB | | | | | |boxstyle_AKB=background-color:LimeGreen;|boxstyle_ZHE=background-color:DarkTurquoise;|KIZ=Sāfav’īyyah-Kızılbaş|GİA=Şîʿa-i Bâtın’îyye|HÜR=Khurrām’īyyah|SİN=Sunbādh’īyyah|BBK=Bābak’īyyah|MUK=Mukannaʿīyyah|HUR=Hurūf’īyyah<ref>Balcıoğlu, Tahir Harimî, Türk Tarihinde Mezhep Cereyanları - The course of madhhab events in Turkish history – Two crucial front in Anatolian Shiism: The fundamental Islamic theology of the Hurufiyya madhhab, (Preface and notes by Hilmi Ziya Ülken), Ahmet Sait Press, page 198, Kanaat Publications, Istanbul, 1940. </ref> Tariqa|AKB=Akbar’īyyah Sūfīsm|ZHE=Zāhed Gaylānī Zāhed’īyyah}}

The Four Poles of Anatolia
Haji Bayram Veli is considered one of the four poles (aqtab'') of Anatolia by all tariqa circles, the others being Mawlana Rumi, Shaban Veli, and Haji Bektash Veli.

Gallery

See also
 List of Sufis
 Bayramiyya
 Khalwatiyya
 Zahidiyye

External links

 Pictures of the Ankara mosque and the mausoleum of the saint

References

People from Ankara
Sufis
Sunni Sufis
Sunni Muslim scholars of Islam
Founders of Sufi orders
Bayramiye order
Hanafis
Turkish Muslims
14th-century poets from the Ottoman Empire
15th-century poets from the Ottoman Empire
Ottoman Sufis
Sufi saints from the Ottoman Empire
Turkish Sufis
Poets from the Ottoman Empire
Turkish poets
1352 births
1430 deaths
Turkic Sufi saints
Islamic scholars from the Ottoman Empire